The 2014 Gujranwala attacks occurred on 27 July 2014 in Gujranwala, Pakistan, when a mob in an alleged case of blasphemy set fire to five houses belonging to the minority Ahmadiyya community in Islam. Three female Ahmadis were killed, including an eight-month-old and a seven-year-old girl. The attack was sparked by a Facebook post.

Background
The Ahmadiyya movement was started in 1889 and follows the teachings of Mirza Ghulam Ahmad, who they believe was sent by God as a prophet and the Promised Messiah and Imam Mehdi prophesied in Islam "to end religious wars, condemn bloodshed and re-institute morality, justice and peace." It is estimated there are between 3 and 4 million Ahmadis in Pakistan.

The Ahmadiyya Muslims have previously been targeted by Sunni groups, while they have also suffered discrimination in Pakistan in the past, most significantly during the Lahore riots of 1953. They were declared non-Muslim in Pakistan in 1973 by Zulfikar Ali Bhutto and were legally banned from identifying themselves as such in 1984 during General Zia-ul-Haq's Islamization as per Ordinance XX, despite Ahmadis calling themselves Muslim and following the rituals of Islam.

Incident
On 27 July 2014, extremists gathered outside a number of Ahmadi Muslim homes in Gujranwala in order to protest after an Ahmadi Muslim was accused of posting blasphemous material of the Ka'ba on the social networking site Facebook. Soon the protest took the shape of violence and the homes of Ahmadi Muslims were burnt, ransacked and looted. At the same time, the extremists obstructed the fire brigades and ambulances. Eight homes belonging to the Ahmadi Muslims were burnt down. In total three female Ahmadi Muslims including an eight-month and a seven-year-old girl died due to suffocation. Another seventh month pregnant woman suffered a miscarriage. Moreover, eight Ahmadi Muslims suffered injuries and were treated for burns at a nearby hospital. Although the police were present, they did little to stop the violence.

References

Attacks in Pakistan in 2014
Mass murder in 2014
Ahmadiyya in Pakistan
Persecution of Ahmadis in Pakistan
Massacres in Pakistan
Terrorist incidents in Pakistan in 2014
Crime in Punjab, Pakistan
Gujranwala